Chicago Area Project (CAP) is an American juvenile delinquency prevention association based in Chicago, Illinois. The association has been acting since early 20th century. The project was founded by University of Chicago criminologist Clifford Shaw. As of 2009, its current executive director is  David E. Whittaker.

The program is considered to be America's first community-based delinquency prevention program.

The project started to fight delinquency at "Russell Square" neighborhood of South Chicago during the 1930s and early 1940s.

About 

In 1934, Clifford Shaw, a University of Chicago sociologist, established the Chicago Area Project (CAP). CAP attempts to resolve local problems, such as gang violence, substance abuse, unemployment, and delinquency.  CAP's goal is to stop delinquency by calling locals to actively engage in community self-development.

CAP has 40 grassroots organizations and special projects that seek to develop young adults and end juvenile delinquency using community building.  CAP associates, alliance partners, and special projects are in less-fortunate neighborhoods in urban areas of Chicago and across Illinois. They offer different services in which they act as mentors, trainers, and facilitators.  Every affiliate is independent and focuses on the specific needs of a neighborhood and its people, which are determined by its leaders. CAP has partnered with nationwide professional and local organizations. They offer programs to help youth service workers become skilled, trained, and to advance their work with young adults.

CAP uses a 3-way approach in order to deal with delinquency and the core causes of it by having direct services, advocacy, and community organizing. CAP enables a diverse group of community stakeholders to improve neighborhood environments, decrease anti-social behavior in young adults, protect children from inappropriate institutionalization, and offer children and young people with role models for their own development.

By implementing continuous advocacy projects and special projects, CAP has contributed to changing workforce development, juvenile justice, welfare and various more. CAP serves local organization and young adults by playing as facilitator, and grant manager. The CAP community works towards solving issues that are neighborhood-specific by using external resources and resolving them. By training and technical assistance, CAP partners with other grassroots organizations assists families and adolescents. In so doing, CAP improves, strengthens, and enhances community life.

History

Clifford Shaw was a strong believer that juvenile delinquency in Chicago was due to deteriorating conditions in neighborhoods.  Notable sociologists from the University of Chicago and the Illinois Institute for Juvenile Research supported Clifford Shaw. He was doubtful of psychological reasons for delinquency and of associations that strived to improve specific delinquents. As a result, he established CAP as an improved version of a grassroots community organization. 
CAP sponsored community organizers made up of locals in high-delinquency neighborhoods.  Shaw also worked with other existing organizations for example the Catholic church which was in a mainly Polish neighborhood of Russell Square.

Initially, CAP's programs had 3 predominant forms. Firstly, it arranged recreation, the Russell Square Community Committee (RSCC) sponsored athletic clubs. Secondly, it improved neighborhood environments; the RSCC along with community locals created a summer camp and cleaned up community parks.  Lastly, it helped delinquents; workers arranged informal guidance sessions for many young gang members.  Workers collaborated with police and teachers when young people were having problems in school or were arrested. Furthermore, when neighborhood youth were on parole, CAP leaders supervised them.

In the 1930s there were only 3 community groups, which then grew to 80 in the late 1960s.  In a lot of the neighborhoods, helping African Americans and Hispanics succeeded the European ethnic groups who CAP first assisted. CAP has consistently been a powerful instrument in community organizing.

See also
 Organized crime in Chicago

References and notes

External links
 Official website

Social work organizations in the United States
Organizations based in Chicago